Karl Friedrich Theodor Dahl (June 24, 1856 in Rosenhofer Brök north of Dahme, Holstein – June 29, 1929 in Greifswald) was a German zoologist, and in particular an arachnologist.

The son of a farmer, Dahl studied at the universities of Leipzig, Freiburg, Berlin and Kiel. His dissertation (1884) was "Beiträge zur Kenntnis des Baus und der Funktion der Insektenbeine". He became a Privatdozent in 1887; with a habilitation thesis "Ueber die Cytheriden der westlichen Ostsee". Around this time he traveled to the Baltic states and (1896–1897) to the Bismarck Archipelago near New Guinea. He was also interested in biogeography.

On April 1, 1898 Dahl became curator of arachnids at the Museum für Naturkunde in Berlin, where he worked under his former teacher, the then museum director Karl Möbius. Dahl remained in Berlin until he retired, and his type collection is held in that museum.

Although he described in many animal groups, Dahl concentrated on spiders. He was also interested in biogeography and animal behaviour.

On June 19, 1899 he married Maria Dahl (1872–1972), a co-worker at the zoological institute of Kiel. She also published several works on spiders.

He is commemorated in the scientific names of a species of snake, Tropidonophis dahlii, and a species of bird, the Bismarck fantail (Rhipidura dahli).

References

Further reading
 (1930). "Friederich Dahl". Mitteilungen aus dem Zoologischen Museum in Berlin 15: 625–632. (in German).
 (1945). Bibliographia araneorum. Tome I. Toulouse: Douladoure. p. 50. (in French).

External links
Schmitt, Elisa Maria; Glaubrecht, Matthias (2012). "Revisiting the "Ralum Project": Molluscs collected by Friedrich Dahl in 1896––1897 for the Museum of Natural History Berlin". Zoosystematics and Evolution 88 (1): 79–95.

Arachnologists
German arachnologists
1929 deaths
1856 births
19th-century German zoologists
20th-century German zoologists